The river Valmont is one of the small rivers that flow from the plateau of the Pays de Caux into the English Channel.

The river rises at an altitude of 56m at the commune of Valmont at a place called le Vivier. It takes a northwest orientation and falls by a slope of 2.8%, passing through the commune of Colleville before joining the sea via the port of Fécamp.

References

Valmont
Valmont
Rivers of Seine-Maritime
0Valmont